Moove may refer to:

 A flavored milk product by Lion Dairy & Drinks
 A virtual world social software product on the List of social software

See also
Move (disambiguation)